Arnaud Malherbe (born 20 November 1972) is a South African sprinter who specialized in the 400 metres.

His personal best time is 44.59 seconds, achieved in March 1999 in Roodepoort. At the time, it was a South African Record. He has the distinction of being the first South African to break 45 seconds in the 400m and was national champion four consecutive times between 1996 and 1999.

Together with Jopie van Oudtshoorn, Hendrick Mokganyetsi and Adriaan Botha he also held the South African record in the 4 × 400 metres relay with 3:00.20 minutes, achieved at the 1999 World Championships in Seville. In those World Championships, he ran the fastest split ever recorded by a South African man, with 43.78s, helping his team win the bronze medal. In 1998, in the World Cup in Johannesburg, he was a member of the African 4x400m Relay Team who eventually received the Bronze medal, after disqualification of the USA team, due to doping violations.

Achievements

External links 
 

1972 births
Living people
South African male sprinters
Commonwealth Games competitors for South Africa
Athletes (track and field) at the 1994 Commonwealth Games
Athletes (track and field) at the 1998 Commonwealth Games
Athletes (track and field) at the 2002 Commonwealth Games
Athletes (track and field) at the 1996 Summer Olympics
Athletes (track and field) at the 2000 Summer Olympics
Athletes (track and field) at the 2004 Summer Olympics
Olympic athletes of South Africa
World Athletics Championships medalists
Competitors at the 1995 Summer Universiade
20th-century South African people
21st-century South African people